Eric Sharp, Baron Sharp of Grimsdyke,  (17 August 1916 – 2 May 1994) was a British businessman and Member of the House of Lords.

Career 
Eric Sharp began his career 1948 as Principal in the Ministry of Power. He was 1948–1950 the UK delegate in the coal and petroleum committees of the Organisation for European Economic Co-operation (OEEC). 1951–1954 he was Vice-Chairman of the Electricity Committee of the OEEC. 1955–1956 he held the position as Secretary to Herbert Committee of Inquiry into Electricity Supply Industry. 1957–1964 he was marketing manager at British Nylon Spinners Ltd. 1964–1968 he was director of ICI Fibres Ltd. Subsequently he worked at Monsanto as member of Board of Monsanto Europe in 1969, as member of the Management Board 1970–1972, as deputy chairman of Monsanto Ltd 1973–1974 and as chairman 1975–1981. He was 1980-90 chairman of Cable & Wireless plc and their chief Executive 1981–1990.

Honours
He was appointed a Commander of the Order of the British Empire (CBE) in the 1980 New Year Honours. 
and became a Knight Bachelor in 1984. On 21 July 1989 he was created a Life Peer as Baron Sharp of Grimsdyke, of Stanmore in the London Borough of Harrow, thus becoming a member of the House of Lords.

Family 
He married Marion Freedman in 1950 and had with her one son Richard Sharp,  and two daughters Nicola, who died in 1982, and Victoria Sharp, who is the President of the King’s Bench Division of the High Court in England and Wales.

References 

1916 births
1994 deaths
Knights Bachelor
Commanders of the Order of the British Empire
Life peers created by Elizabeth II